Valerie Aiken Boles ( Fennell; November 8, 1932 – May 8, 2009) was an American root doctor. She came to prominence after becoming the inspiration for one of the main characters in John Berendt's 1994 true-crime book Midnight in the Garden of Good and Evil.

Boles, of Gullah tongue, was renamed "Minerva" in the book, and was portrayed by Irma P. Hall in Clint Eastwood's 1997 film adaptation.

Early life
Valerie Fennell was born on November 8, 1932, in Islandton, South Carolina, to William Husie Fennell, a U.S. Army veteran of the First World War, and Selena Jones.

Her mother died in 1938, when Valerie was five years old. Her father remarried, to Sheldonia Glover (1917–1979). Between the two marriages, Boles had three brothers and eleven sisters.

At an early age, Boles became a baptized member of the Deep Creek Missionary Baptist Church in Islandton. After graduating Mather Junior College in the early 1960s, she became a licensed beautician in Beaufort County.

Personal life
Boles was in a common-law marriage with Percy H. Washington (1890–1973), a root doctor known as Dr. Eagle (renamed Dr. Buzzard in the film version of Midnight in the Garden of Good and Evil) with whom she had one child: Anthony Ray Fennell (1954–2019). Boles took over Washington's practice, which doubled as their 1950-built 1408 Congress Street home in Beaufort, South Carolina, after his death in 1973.
She later married Edward Boles.

In 1994, John Berendt changed Boles' name to "Minerva" and included her in his novel Midnight in the Garden of Good and Evil.  Other than the moniker, and her marriage to Dr. Buzzard, Berendt has said "the story about Boles in the novel is true". Minerva was portrayed by Irma P. Hall in Clint Eastwood's 1997 film adaptation. The "garden" in the book's title is a cemetery in Beaufort. In the film, Savannah's Bonaventure Cemetery was used to represent the "colored cemetery down the road".

A recluse, Boles would rarely allow her photograph to be taken (there were only two known occurrences), much less allow people to touch her, due to her belief that she would become jinxed by a curse. "When you gave her money, she didn't want you to hand it to her," John Berendt said at the time of her death. "You had to put it down on a table or on the floor, because that way you can't 'work' with her hands. If you touch her, you're 'working her hand.'"

Although he appeared in the book, Sonny Seiler, a former attorney from Savannah, Georgia, played Judge Samuel L. White in the film (his own role being filled by Australian actor Jack Thompson). Seiler explained that he would meet with Boles on a bench in Savannah's Monterey Square. "We'd sit out there a few minutes, but she'd never say anything. She didn't trust me." Seiler visited Boles at her home in Beaufort, in 2002. "The house reeked of some strange incense," he said. "I gave her some money, and she smiled. I asked her if she ever got back to Savannah, and she said she didn't. She said she couldn't travel."

During the 1980s, Boles would often visit Savannah's Forsyth Park, a block south of the Mercer House home of Jim Williams, the main character in Midnight in the Garden of Good and Evil and whom Seiler represented for the final three of Williams' four trials for the shooting of Danny Hansford, for which he was accused of murder. "Jim would give her $20 or something because she’d tell him what was going on in the community, which he valued," explained Seiler. "She was his mole."

According to Berendt, Boles said that she had been in touch with Williams after he died in 1990.

In 2004, Boles was featured in Life magazine.

Death
Boles died on May 8, 2009, at Beaufort Memorial Hospital, aged 76. She is interred in Jerusalem Baptist Church Cemetery in Cummings, South Carolina, along with her father and son.

References

1932 births
2009 deaths
People from Beaufort, South Carolina
Hoodoo (spirituality)
20th-century American women
21st-century American women
Hoodoo conjurors